Kimiko Okamoto  is a Japanese athlete.  She won gold medals in  the  relay  and individual 200 metres  in the 1951 Asian Games.

References

Athletes (track and field) at the 1951 Asian Games
Athletes (track and field) at the 1954 Asian Games
Japanese female sprinters
Asian Games gold medalists for Japan
Asian Games silver medalists for Japan
Asian Games bronze medalists for Japan
Asian Games medalists in athletics (track and field)
Medalists at the 1951 Asian Games
Medalists at the 1954 Asian Games
Possibly living people
Year of birth missing